Russia was scheduled to participate in the Eurovision Song Contest 2022 in Turin, Italy. However, due to the 2022 Russian invasion of Ukraine, the European Broadcasting Union (EBU) excluded Russia from participating. Russia was originally set to perform in the second half of the first semi-final on 10 May 2022.

Background

Prior to the 2022 contest, Russia has participated in the Eurovision Song Contest 23 times since its first entry in 1994. In , "Russian Woman" performed by Manizha qualified for the final and ultimately finished ninth with 204 points.

Before Eurovision

Artist selection 
No official announcement was made by national broadcaster VGTRK regarding the Russian selection for 2022. According to non-confirmed rumors, shortlisted acts included Aleksandr Panayotov, Danya Milokhin, Egor Kreed, Vanya Dmitrienko, Klava Koka and Yaroslava Simonova. Later, the number of artists on the shortlist was reduced to three: two women (Klava Koka, Yaroslava Simonova) and one man, among whom VGTRK selected a representative. Ultimately, Yaroslava Simonova was reportedly selected as the Russian representative.

Exclusion 
In the wake of the 2022 Russian invasion of Ukraine, which began on 24 February, Ukrainian broadcaster UA:PBC appealed to suspend Russian EBU member broadcasters VGTRK and Channel One from the union, and to exclude Russia from competing in the contest. The appeal alleged that since the beginning of the Russian military intervention in Ukraine in 2014, VGTRK and Channel One had been a mouthpiece for the Russian government and a key tool of political propaganda financed from the Russian state budget. The EBU initially stated that Russia as well as Ukraine would still be allowed to participate in the contest, citing the non-political nature of the event. Gustav Lützhøft, editor-in-chief of Dansk Melodi Grand Prix for Danish broadcaster DR, stated: "we find it incompatible with Eurovision's values that Russia is participating." Sweden's SVT, Iceland's RÚV, Lithuania's LRT and Norway's NRK also called on the EBU to exclude Russia from the contest, while the Netherlands' AVROTROS, Poland's TVP and Ukraine's UA:PBC additionally called on the EBU to suspend Russia's membership of the union. Estonia's ERR and Finland's Yle stated that they would not participate if Russia were invited. Latvian representatives at the 2022 contest, Citi Zēni, called on the EBU in an email to reconsider their decision to allow Russia to compete.

On 25 February 2022, the EBU announced that Russia would not compete at the contest, stating that "in light of the unprecedented crisis in Ukraine, the inclusion of a Russian entry in this year's Contest would bring the competition into disrepute." The following day, all EBU members from Russia, including VGTRK and Channel One, announced their withdrawal from the union; however, the EBU itself had yet to receive a confirmation. On 1 March, a further statement from the EBU announced that it had suspended its Russian members from its governance structures.

After Eurovision 
On 26 May 2022, the EBU made effective the suspension of its Russian members, causing Russia to indefinitely lose broadcasting and participation rights for future Eurovision events.

References 

2022
Countries in the Eurovision Song Contest 2022
Eurovision
Eurovision
Eurovision